Jody Holden (born August 20, 1968) is a Canadian beach volleyball who won the gold medal in the men's beach team competition at the 1999 Pan American Games in Winnipeg, Manitoba, Canada, partnering Conrad Leinemann. He represented his native country at the 2000 Summer Olympics in Sydney, Australia.

References

External links
 

1968 births
Living people
Canadian men's beach volleyball players
Beach volleyball players at the 2000 Summer Olympics
Olympic beach volleyball players of Canada
Beach volleyball players at the 1999 Pan American Games
Sportspeople from Nova Scotia
People from Shelburne County, Nova Scotia
Pan American Games gold medalists for Canada
Pan American Games medalists in volleyball
Medalists at the 1999 Pan American Games